Arsion (full official name Hyper Visual Fighting Arsion; frequently styled as ARSION) was a joshi puroresu (women's professional wrestling) promotion established in 1997 by Aja Kong. The first event took place on February 18, 1998 and was called "Virgin".

History
In its initial conception, the major key figures in the company were founder Aja Kong, president, ex-AJW businessman Hiroshi "Rossy" Ogawa, manager Sakie Hasegawa and trainer Mariko Yoshida. Arsion's first event, entitled Virgin, took place in front of a sell-out crowd in Tokyo on February 18, 1998.

Arsion's wrestlers were trained at the promotion's dojo daily and attended Pancrase and Battlarts dojo events weekly, learning the styles of professional wrestling, lucha libre and shoot wrestling. The following year, in an attempt to boost audience numbers, Arsion put wrestlers Ai Fujita, AKINO, Ayako Hamada and Candy Okutsu together to form a pop group called Cazai. The act was an attempt to recreate the success of previous teams such as the Beauty Pair and Crush Gals, but in the end failed, leading to Arsion splitting the members up. Arsion then made another attempt to regain their audience by pushing former Cazai member Hamada to the top of the promotion with her defeating Aja Kong for the Queen of Arsion Championship in late 2000.

In 2001, Aja Kong left Arsion following a disagreement with management over the promotion's direction and subsequently sued president Ogawa for falsely advertising her for upcoming events. Kong's departure was followed by Ogawa signing Lioness Asuka as the promotion's new booker. Asuka proceeded to push herself, Etsuko Mita, Gami and Mima Shimoda into major storylines. In 2002, Ayako Hamada quit Arsion over internal politics within the promotion, feeling that she had been blamed for Arsion's recent problems and pushed down the card since Asuka took over the booking. Hamada joined Aja Kong at the Gaea Japan promotion. Arsion finally folded during the summer of 2003, after which Yumiko Hotta took over the promotion and renamed it AtoZ.

Championships

Tournaments

Alumni

 Ai Fujita
 Aja Kong
 Mika Akino
 Alda Moreno
 Azumi Hyuga
 April Hunter
 Ayako Hamada
 Candy Okutsu
 Chaparita Asari
 Debbie Malenko
 Etsuko Mita
 Faby Apache
 Hiromi Yagi
 Jessie Bennett
 Kaori Yoneyama
 Lady Metal

 Linda Starr
 Mari Apache
 Mariko Yoshida
 Melissa
 Michiko Omukai
 Mima Shimoda
 Mikiko Futagami
 Natsumi Nakazawa
 Piko
 Princesa Sujei
 Reggie Bennett
 Rie Tamada
 Sakie Hasegawa
 Yumi Fukawa

References

External links

See also

 Puroresu

 
Japanese women's professional wrestling promotions
Sport in Tokyo
1997 establishments in Japan